Water torture encompasses a variety of techniques using water to inflict physical or psychological harm on a victim as a form of torture or execution.

Forced ingestion

In this form of water torture, water is forced down the throat and into the stomach. It was used as a legal torture and execution method by the courts in France in the 17th and 18th centuries. At the end of the 19th century and beginning of the 20th century it was used against Filipinos by American Forces during the Philippine–American War and was employed against British Commonwealth, American and Chinese prisoners during World War II by the Japanese. The Human Rights Watch organization reports that in the 2000s, security forces in Uganda sometimes forced a detainee to lie face up under an open water spigot.

Water intoxication can result from drinking too much water. This has caused some fatalities over the years in fraternities in North America during initiation week.  For example, a person was hazed to death by Chi Tau (local) of Chico State (California) in 2005 via the forcing of pushups and the drinking of water from a bottle.

Fear of drowning

Waterboarding refers to a technique involving water poured over the face or head of the subject in order to evoke the instinctive fear of drowning. Often a wet cloth is placed in the subject's mouth, giving them the impression that they are drowning.

Dripping water

What is called the "Chinese water torture" was a torture described by Hippolytus de Marsiliis in the 16th century that was supposed to drive its victim insane with the stress of water dripping on a part of the forehead for a very long time.  It may also be characterised by the inconsistent pattern of water drips.  There are no expert opinions on the true cause of torture in this method.

Dunking

This form of torture was used in the early modern period as a trial by ordeal.

Other forms
Supposedly, the Rasphuis in Amsterdam, a 17th-century institution that attempted to rehabilitate young male criminals through labor, contained a "water dungeon", the so-called Waterhuis.  If prisoners refused to work, they were placed in a cellar that quickly filled with water after a sluice was opened and were handed a pump that enabled them to keep from drowning. Geert Mak and other authors, however, point out that there is no evidence for the existence of this room.
 In the 20th century, various U.S. newspapers published details of "water torture" (or the "torture of thirst") in Japan which involved subjecting the victim to a high salt diet for several days, without rice or water, and then offering them water in exchange for a confession: "it is difficult to imagine a more cruel device."

Other
 Chinese Water Torture Cell
 Trial by drowning

References 

 
Torture
Water